The 1999 National Lacrosse League season is the 13th season in the NLL that began on December 26, 1998, and concluded with the championship game on April 23, 1999. The Toronto Rock celebrated their first season in Toronto by winning the championship, defeating the Rochester Knighthawks 13-10 at Maple Leaf Gardens.

The playoffs featured the lowest score by a team in NLL history, when goaltender Bob Watson and the Toronto Rock defeated the Philadelphia Wings 13-2.

Team movement
The only change of teams from the 1998 NLL season to 1999 was the movement of the Ontario Raiders from Hamilton down the QEW to Toronto to become the Toronto Rock.

Regular season

All Star Game
The 1999 All-Star Game took place at the Blue Cross Arena in Rochester, where Team Canada defeated Team USA by a score of 25-24.

Playoffs

Awards

Weekly awards
Each week, a player is awarded "Player of the Week" honours.

Monthly awards
Awards are also given out monthly for the best overall player and best rookie.

Statistics leaders
Bold numbers indicate new single-season records. Italics indicate tied single-season records.

See also
 1999 in sports

References
1999 Archive at the Outsider's Guide to the NLL

99
NLL